A discharge ionization detector (DID) is a type of detector used in gas chromatography.

Principle
A DID is an ion detector which uses a high-voltage electric discharge to produce ions.  The  detector  uses  an  electrical  discharge  in  helium  to
generate high energy UV photons and metastable helium which  ionizes  all  compounds  except  helium.   The ions produce an electric current, which is the signal output of the detector.  The greater the concentration of the component, the more ions are produced, and the greater the current.

Application
DIDs are sensitive to a broad range of components.
In Air Separation plants they are used to detect the components CO; CH2; C+; N2; O2 in Argon product in ppm range.

DIDs are non-destructive detectors.  They do not destroy/consume the components they detect.  Therefore, they can be used before other detectors in multiple-detector configurations.

DIDs are an improvement over Helium ionization detectors in that they contain no radioactive source.

References

Gas chromatography